Ashgate Publishing was an academic book and journal publisher based in Farnham (Surrey, United Kingdom). It was established in 1967 and specialised in the social sciences, arts, humanities and professional practice. It had an American office in Burlington, Vermont, and another British office in London. It is now a subsidiary of Informa (Taylor & Francis).

The company had two imprints: Gower Publishing published professional business and management titles, and Lund Humphries, originally established in 1939, publishes illustrated art books, particularly in the field of modern British art. In March 2015, Gower unveiled GpmFirst, a web-based community of practice allowing subscribers access to more than 120 project management titles, as well as discussions and articles relevant to business and project management.

In July 2015, it was announced that Ashgate had been sold to Informa for a reported £20M, and Lund Humphries was relaunched as an independent publisher in December 2015. By February 2016, the independent imprints of Ashgate became part of the Routledge imprint.

References

External links 
  (archive)

Book publishing companies of the United Kingdom
Book publishing companies of the United States
Educational book publishing companies
Academic publishing companies
Publishing companies established in 1967
1967 establishments in the United Kingdom